Kim Hyeon-jun (born 18 October 1992) is a South Korean sports shooter. He competed in the men's 50 metre rifle three positions event at the 2016 Summer Olympics.

References

External links
 
 

1992 births
Living people
South Korean male sport shooters
Olympic shooters of South Korea
Shooters at the 2016 Summer Olympics
Place of birth missing (living people)
Universiade medalists in shooting
Asian Games medalists in shooting
Asian Games silver medalists for South Korea
Shooters at the 2014 Asian Games
Medalists at the 2014 Asian Games
Shooters at the 2018 Asian Games
Universiade bronze medalists for South Korea
Medalists at the 2013 Summer Universiade
Medalists at the 2015 Summer Universiade
20th-century South Korean people
21st-century South Korean people